I, Max was a sports commentary show featuring host Max Kellerman and Michael Holley that aired nightly on Fox Sports Net. The concept of the show involved Kellerman and his ego (explaining the name of the show) against the world, represented by Holley, broadcasting via satellite from Boston, with producer Bill Wolff, the former "Disembodied Voice" from Around the Horn, appearing live from NYC as the "impartial" mediator.

On January 18, 2018 on his daily sports radio show in Boston on weei 93.7 the "Dale & Holley" show Michael Holley said Woody Paige was the first choice to join Kellerman but Paige declined the offer and the role was offered to Holley.

Format
Each show opened with Kellerman relaying three bits of information he has heard/been told of. He always concluded by saying, "but I, Max, say wrong, wrong, wrong" and would add a pithy comment afterward.

The show was divided into segments, with topics in each segment being scored as "rounds" (not unlike boxing, which Max has a background in as an analyst for HBO and previously ESPN2). The show was originally scored on a 10-point scale system like a boxing match, with the loser of the round scoring 9 in most cases (8 or less if Wolff determined the argument to be weak enough to warrant it). This later was changed to the winner of the argument getting credit for winning the round. Originally a 15-round format, the show later reduced the rounds to 12.

The show was conducted as follows:

 Segment 1: Kellerman and Holley argued over the day's sports topics, with Max being presented with the argument from the World's side and countering it with his own opinion while Holley would defend the World's side. Max could stop Holley -or Wolff- from commenting at any time with the use of the "MeVR", a button that immediately paused their video screens and prevented them from talking. Kellerman would often use the button on Holley in order to interject so he could respond to Holley's argument without talking over him. His use of the button on Wolff was often used as a comic annoyance, with Wolff feigning frustration on camera afterward.
 Segment 2: The second segment of the show saw Kellerman and Holley square off against each other in a rotating series of argument-based segments. One was called "I Object," where Max and Holley took turns presenting cases for a certain sports subject, with the other side almost always jumping in by saying "I object" and presenting the opposing view. Wolff served as the "honorable judge" (dressed as a barrister, even down to a powdered wig) and would either sustain (give the round to the objector) or overrule (give the round to whoever was presenting the case) the objection accordingly. Another segment was "The Great Flip-Off," where Wolff (dressed as an old card shark dubbed Willie "12 Fingers" Wolff) would arbitrarily give Max and Holley two sides of an argument and would score based on who made the better argument for their side. After this segment Holley's involvement with the show ended, although he would appear during the final segment (usually gloating if his side won, which was often immediately met with Kellerman hitting the MeVR).
 Segment 3: An interview with a sports figure, ranging from sports columnists to athletes. The entire segment was scored as one round, and if Kellerman performed well enough the round went to him. The World was credited with the round if he didn't.
 Segment 4: Max read short emails about topics (sports or otherwise) written by viewers in a rapid-fire segment. Max would then give his opinion on the topic that was the subject of the email. If Max's opinion wasn't considered strong enough, Wolff gave the round to the World side. If there was not enough time to finish all the rounds before the end of the show, Wolff had the power to arbitrarily end the fight after one of the arguments. This would be regarded as either Kellerman or The World being "knocked out." If The World won, Wolff read a brief hate e-mail from a viewer. If Kellerman won, Wolff read a positive fan e-mail, referred to as "love mail".

Late in the show's run, the format changed. The first round would still feature the same debate between Holley and Max, but they were no longer scored. The next two segments usually consisted of Kellerman conducting interviews, although there was an occasional second segment game from the previous format that Holley would participate in (otherwise, his time on the show ended after the first segment). The final segment saw Bill Wolff make his first appearance of the show and again saw Max answer emails from viewers, with Wolff arbitrarily deciding after the segment was over whether Kellerman would receive love or hate mail.

Cancellation
The show was the most popular show on Fox Sports Net, though many people thought the show to be too similar in style to Max's former show, Around the Horn. Despite the high ratings, the last episode of I, Max aired on February 18, 2005, nine months after it debuted. Max Kellerman, on the other hand, has an explanation for the demise of I, Max. According to statements made by Kellerman frequently on his radio show, the show was the highest-rated show on Fox Sports. The cancellation of I, Max, according to Kellerman, was due to his not agreeing to making changes to the show's format that he viewed would damage the show. He also took time away from sports television media just beforehand and after the cancellation due to grief over his brother's October 2004 death from a homicide, which former boxer James Butler was convicted for carrying out.

References 

Fox Sports Networks original programming
2004 American television series debuts
American sports television series
2005 American television series endings